is an airport located  east of Hakodate Station in Hakodate, a city in Hokkaidō, Japan. It is operated by the Ministry of Land, Infrastructure, Transport and Tourism.

History 
Hakodate airport opened in 1961 with a single 1,200 m runway. A new terminal upgrade and runway extension to 2,000 m became operational in 1971. The runway was extended further to 2,500 m in 1978 and to 3,000 m in 1999. A new terminal building opened in 2005.

On September 6, 1976, Soviet pilot Viktor Belenko defected to the West by landing a MiG-25 Foxbat aircraft at Hakodate Airport.

On June 21, 1995, All Nippon Airways Flight 857, a scheduled Boeing 747 flight from Tokyo to Hakodate, was hijacked by Fumio Kutsumi, a Tokyo bank employee armed with a screwdriver. Kutsumi claimed to be acting on behalf of Aum Shinrikyo leader Shoko Asahara. The aircraft landed in Hakodate and stayed on the runway overnight for 15 hours before riot police stormed the aircraft at dawn and freed the passengers.

Airlines and destinations

Passenger

Statistics

Ground transportation
Scheduled buses operate to Hakodate Station and the Onuma Prince Hotel.

In popular culture
The animated film Detective Conan: Magician of the Silver Sky depicts an emergency landing at the airport.

References

External links

 Hakodate Airport Terminal Building Co., Ltd.
Hakodate Airport Guide from Japan Airlines
 
 

Airports in Hokkaido
Buildings and structures in Hakodate
Airports established in 1961
1961 establishments in Japan
Transport in Hakodate